The 1936 United States presidential election in Arizona took place on November 3, 1936, as part of the 1936 United States presidential election. State voters chose three representatives, or electors, to the Electoral College, who voted for president and vice president.

Arizona was won by incumbent President Franklin D. Roosevelt (D–New York), running with incumbent Vice President John Nance Garner, with 69.85% of the popular vote, against Governor of Kansas Alf Landon (R–Kansas), running with publisher Frank Knox, with 26.93% of the popular vote. , this is the best showing ever for a presidential candidate in Arizona.

Results

Results by county

References

Arizona
1936
1936 Arizona elections